Eduard Valentinovich Nikolaev (born 21 August 1984) is a Russian rally raid driver, best known for winning the 2013 Dakar Rally, 2017 Dakar Rally, 2018 Dakar Rally and the 2019 Dakar Rally in the truck category for Kamaz.

Career
Nikolaev made his Dakar debut in 2006 as mechanic for Kamaz's Sergey Reshetnikov, finishing in 18th overall, before moving across to the crew led by Ilgizar Mardeev in 2007. Along with Aydar Belyaev, the trio finished a creditable second place, three hours down on the winning time set by Hans Stacey.

For the 2009 edition, Nikolaev moved across to join multiple champion Vladimir Chagin and his co-driver Sergey Savostin, finishing second overall (with four stage victories) behind the crew led by another Kamaz driver, Firdaus Kabirov, by a margin of less than four minutes. In 2010, Nikolaev remained alongside Chagin and Savostin, the three dominating the year's competition by taking 9 of a possible 14 stage wins - a Dakar Rally record.

Nikolaev had his first taste of driving duties at the 2010 edition of the Silk Way Rally, which he won.  The Russian proceeded to make his Dakar Rally driving debut in 2011, finishing third behind teammates Chagin and Kabirov, albeit over three hours down on the winning time. 

The retirement of Chagin and Kabirov prior to the 2012 event theoretically made Nikolaev the Kamaz team leader, but he was nevertheless disqualified from the event for colliding with a competitor in the car category on the fourth stage. In 2013, Nikolaev profited from delays for rival and defending champion Gérard de Rooy, and despite failing to win a stage took victory in the overall classification by a margin of 37 minutes from Kamaz teammates Ayrat Mardeev and Andrey Karginov.

Dakar Rally results

 2006: co-driver for Sergey Reshetnikov
 2007: co-driver for Ilgizar Mardeev
 2009 and 2010: co-driver for Vladimir Chagin
 2020: finished in the "Dakar Experience" category

Winner
Dakar Rally: 2010, 2013, 2017, 2018, 2019
Silk Way Rally: 2010
Khazar Steppes: 2010
Russian Championship: 2012
Kagan's Gold: 2012

Awards
2006: Medal "For Valorous Labour"
2007: Medal of the "Order of Merit for the Motherland" II Degree
2010: Order of Friendship
2010: Merit badge "For the Service to the Town of Naberezhnye Chelny"
2011: "Merited Transport Worker of Tatarstan"
2014: Certificate of Honour by the Republic of Tatarstan
2014: Certificate of Honour by the President of Russia
2015: Gratitude by President of Tatarstan
2017: Medal of the "Order of Merit for Republic of Tatarstan"

References

External links
Profile on Dakar Rally
Profile on Team Kamaz Master

Dakar Rally drivers
Dakar Rally winning drivers
1984 births
Living people
Russian rally drivers
Off-road racing drivers
Rally raid truck drivers
Dakar Rally co-drivers